Aparna B. Marar is an Indian classical dancer, organiser, art educator, choreographer and singer. She is also an engineer with a postgraduate degree in wireless communication engineering from PSG College of Technology. She has received numerous honours including the Kerala Sangeetha Nataka Academy's Yuva Prathibha Award, Calicut University's Kalathilakam Award, and a national scholarship by Ministry of Culture.

She is an empanelled artist of Indian Council for Cultural Relations, and a member of the American Dance Therapy Association. She is the director of the Kalabharathi Foundation for Indian Culture and Heritage, a non-profitable cultural organization, regularly organising festivals, workshops and welfare programmes.

Marar takes part in art appreciation programmes for the common people and students.

Professional life and career
She is a student of Kalamandalam Kshemavathy in Mohiniyattom. She also trained under Isaimani R. Vaidyanatha Bhagavathar in Carnatic music,

Under the banner of the Kalabharathi Foundation for Indian Culture and Heritage, Marar organises festivals for the promotion of youth in Indian classical arts.

Awards and honours
 Yuva Prathibha Award by Kerala Sangeetha Nataka Akademi in 2010 in Mohiniyattom
 Kalathilakam awards by Calicut University in 2009 and 2010
 Secured first prize in Mohiniyattom, Bharathantyam in Calicut University interzone arts festival 2009 and 2010 
 Received the scholarship to young artists by Ministry of Culture, Government of India in Mohiniyattom- 2009
 Winner in Inter-university national youth festival 2010 held at Thirupathy, in classical dance
 Empanelled artist of Indian Council for Cultural Relations
 Graded artist of Doordarshan, India
 Associate member of American Dance Therapy Association, 2014
 Member of Student Grievance Redressal Cell, University of Calicut in 2010
 Member of International Dance Council – UNESCO, 2011

References

People from Guruvayur
Indian female classical dancers
Performers of Indian classical dance
Indian women engineers
Living people
Dancers from Kerala
Year of birth missing (living people)
Kuchipudi exponents
Bharatanatyam exponents
Mohiniyattam exponents
Engineers from Kerala
Women artists from Kerala
21st-century Indian women artists
21st-century Indian dancers